The National Bank for Economic and Social Development (abbreviated: BNDES) is a development bank structured as a federal public company associated with the Ministry of the Economy of Brazil. The stated goal is to provide long-term financing for endeavors that contribute to the country's development. BNDES is one of the largest development banks in the world (after the Chinese Development Bank, which boasts assets of around RMB 7.52 trillion, or around $1.2 tn). Its non-performing loan ratio is also less favorable (2.2%) compared to the CDB's that stands below 1%.

Among the objectives of BNDES are the strengthening of the capital structure of private companies, the development of capital markets, the trading of machines and equipment and the financing of exports.

Since its establishment on June 20, 1952, BNDES has financed large-scale industrial and infrastructure endeavors and has played a significant role in the support of investments in agriculture, commerce, and the service industry, as well as in small- and medium-sized private businesses, even though its focus lies on larger firms. The bank has supported social investments aimed at education and health, family agriculture, basic sanitation and mass transportation.

The bank offers financial support lines and programs to companies of any size and sector that have been set up in the country. The partnership with financial institutions with agencies established around the country facilitates the dissemination of credit, enabling greater access to BNDES's financial services.

BNDES has three integral subsidiaries: FINAME, BNDESPAR, and BNDES Limited. Together, the three companies comprise the BNDES System.

Criticism and controversies 
BNDES has been accused of operating with larger firms in a corrupt manner and giving help to big corporations instead of small and medium-sized private businesses.

Operating with statutes of "ethical and environmental principles", in 2012, BNDES approved a 22.5 billion real loan for the construction of the Belo Monte Dam, a project that displaced  local communities. The plan was strongly criticized by environmental groups and indigenous populations.

In 2013 ~90% of BNDESPAR investments concentrates in five industries. In recent BNDES investments, lobby irregularities and conflict of interest arrives with JBS S.A. OGX/EBX Group, GPA (company), and others.

The bank has been criticized for supporting the international expansion of some private firms.

Economists around the world recognize that Brazil has its own development bank, a key financial organization, bigger than the World Bank. As the Nobel Prize economist  J. Stiglitz opinion, "... the BNDES is a huge development bank (...) People don’t realize this, but Brazil has actually shown how a single country can create a very effective development bank (...) that actually promotes real development without all the conditionality and all the trappings around the old institutions".
Despite the recognition of financial volume, effective infrastructure and organization, the bank is used by only a few industries. The concentration of financial volume in few and perhaps questionable industries contradicts the bank's development and diffusion goals. The concentration contrasts greatly with Brazilian's per capita income and its many small and medium-sized enterprises.

External links
 
  Introduction to Banco Nacional de Desenvolvimento Econômico e Social in English

References

Banks of Brazil
Companies based in Rio de Janeiro (city)
Banks established in 1952
1952 establishments in Brazil
Government-owned companies of Brazil
Development finance institutions
Economic development
Trade routes
National development banks